Douglas Narrell (December 27, 1928 – April 3, 2016) was a Canadian football player who played for the Edmonton Eskimos. He previously college football at Texas Christian University.

References

1928 births
2016 deaths
American football tackles
Canadian football tackles
American players of Canadian football
TCU Horned Frogs football players
Edmonton Elks players